Euastacus monteithorum is a species of southern crawfish in the family Parastacidae.

The IUCN conservation status of Euastacus monteithorum is "CR", critically endangered. The species faces an extremely high risk of extinction in the immediate future. The IUCN status was reviewed in 2010.

References

Further reading

 
 

Euastacus
Articles created by Qbugbot
Crustaceans described in 1989